The 2017 season was the 120th season of competitive football in Sweden. Sweden will participate in qualifying for the 2018 FIFA World Cup.

Domestic results

Men's football

2017 Allsvenskan

2018 Allsvenskan playoffs 

Trelleborgs FF won 3–1 on aggregate

2017 Superettan

2018 Superettan playoffs 

1–1 on aggregate. IK Frej won on away goals.

Örgryte IS won 4–3 on aggregate.

National teams

Sweden men's national football team

2018 FIFA World Cup qualification

2018 FIFA World Cup play-off

Sweden won 1–0 on aggregate and qualified for the 2018 FIFA World Cup.

Friendlies

Total results summary

Sweden national under-21 football team

2017 UEFA European Under-21 Championship

Group stage

Friendlies

2019 UEFA Euro Under-21 Championship qualification

Total results summary

Sweden national under-19 football team

2017 UEFA European Under-19 Championship qualification

2017 UEFA European Under-19 Championship

Group stage

Sweden national under-17 football team

2017 UEFA European Under-17 Championship qualification

Sweden women's national football team

UEFA Women's Euro 2017

Group stage

Knockout stage

2019 FIFA Women's World Cup qualification

2017 Algarve Cup

Group stage

Ranking of 7th placed teams

7th place match

Friendlies

Total results summary

Notes

References

 
Seasons in Swedish football